The Romania Coach of the Year is an annual association football award given by the Gazeta Sporturilor newspaper to the head coach in Romania adjudged to have been the best during a calendar year. Mircea Lucescu and Dan Petrescu hold the record for the most wins with five each.

The award was created in 2004, with both Romanian coaches operating inside the country and abroad being eligible for the award, as well as foreign coaches in Romania. The only winner in the latter category is Ukrainian manager Oleh Protasov, who received the trophy for his performances with FC Steaua București in 2005.

Other annual honours handed out by Gazeta Sporturilor include the Romanian Footballer of the Year and the Foreign Player of the Year in Romania awards.

Winners

Breakdown of winners

By number of wins

See also
Gazeta Sporturilor Romanian Footballer of the Year
Gazeta Sporturilor Foreign Player of the Year in Romania
Gazeta Sporturilor Monthly Football Awards

References

External links
Gazeta Sporturilor official website 

Coach
Association football manager of the year awards
Awards established in 2004
2004 establishments in Romania